JSC Uzbekistan Airways, operating as Uzbekistan Airways, is the flag carrier airline of Uzbekistan, headquartered in Tashkent. From its hub at Islam Karimov Tashkent International Airport, the airline serves a number of domestic destinations; the company also flies international services to Asia, Europe and North America.

History 

Following the dissolution of the Soviet Union, Uzbek President Islam Karimov in 1992 authorised the creation of Uzbekistan Airways. The airline was established on 28 January 1992, and took over the operations of the Uzbekistan division of Aeroflot on 31 May 1992. In 1993, Uzbekistan Airways acquired its first two Airbus A310-300s. The two A310s were counted as part of the fleet , along with Russian-built aircraft (25 Antonov An-24/26s, one Ilyushin Il-62, 13 Ilyushin Il-76s, one Ilyushin Il-86s, 23 Tupolev Tu-154 and three Yakovlev Yak-40s). By this time, the airline was still the sole operator in the country. Late in 1995, the carrier ordered its first Boeing aircraft: two Boeing 767-300ERs and a single Boeing 757.

Uzbekistan Airways was the launch customer for the Ilyushin Il-114; it took delivery of the first, locally assembled aircraft, in July 1998. In June 1998, the airline took delivery of the last-built Airbus A310 ever (msn. 706, reg. UK-31003). Two more Boeing 757-200s were directly ordered from Boeing in April 1999. Late in 1999, the company took ownership of the first of these two 184-seater Boeing 757-200.

At , the airline had 16,296 employees. At this time, the fleet comprised three Airbus A310-300s, three Antonov An-12s, one Antonov An-24, 18 Antonov An-24Bs, three Antonov An-24RVs, three Boeing 757-200s, two Boeing 767-300ERs, three Avro RJ85s, four Ilyushin Il-114s, two Ilyushin Il-62s, six Ilyushin Il-62Ms, ten Ilyushin Il-76Ts, nine Ilyushin Il-86s, 15 Tupolev Tu-154Bs, two Tupolev Tu-154Ms and 19 Yakovlev Yak-40s. Destinations served at the time included Almaty, Amsterdam, Andizhan, Ashgabat, Athens, Baku, Bangkok, Beijing, Bishkek, Bukhara, Chelyabinsk, Delhi, Dhaka, Ekaterinburg, Fergana, Frankfurt, Istanbul, Jeddah, Karshi, Kazan, Khabarovsk, Kuala Lumpur, London, Mineralnye Vody, Moscow, Namangan, New York, Novosibirsk, Nukus, Omsk, Paris, Riyadh, Rostov-on-Don, Samara, Samarkand, Seoul, Sharjah, Simferopol, St. Petersburg, Tashkent, Tel Aviv, Termez, Tyumen, Ufa and Urgench.

Two more Boeing 767-300ERs, equipped with Pratt & Whitney PW4000 powerplants, were ordered in 2001 and scheduled for delivery in 2002.

Uzbekistan Airways carried 2.625 million passengers in 2014, a 1.9% decrease year-on-year (YOY), whereas 4.6% more cargo was handled YOY.

Destinations 

Since its formation, Uzbekistan Airways has focused its passenger service on Western Europe and other international locations. Most international flights operate from Tashkent, although international services to other Uzbek cities exist. The carrier is not part of any partnership or airline alliance.

Codeshare agreements
Uzbekistan Airways has codeshare agreements with the following airlines:

 airBaltic
 Belavia
 Korean Air
 Malaysia Airlines
 S7 Airlines
 Turkish Airlines
 Ural Airlines

Interline agreements
Uzbekistan Airways has interline agreements with the following airlines:

 AccesRail (Railway)
 Aeroflot
 Air Astana
 airBaltic
 Air Europa
 Air France
 All Nippon Airways
 APG Airlines
 Arkia
 Asiana Airlines
 Azerbaijan Airlines
 Bangkok Airways
 Belavia
 China Southern Airlines
 Czech Airlines
 Delta Air Lines
 Etihad Airways
 Flynas
 Garuda Indonesia
 Hahn Air
 Iberia
 Japan Airlines
 KLM
 Korean Air
 Lufthansa
 Malaysia Airlines
 Qantas
 Qatar Airways
 S7 Airlines
 Singapore Airlines
 SriLankan Airlines
 Thai Airways International
 Turkish Airlines
 Ukraine International Airlines
 Ural Airlines

Fleet

Current fleet

, the airline operates the following aircraft:

Fleet development

In mid-2007, the carrier ordered six Airbus A320s; by that time the fleet was 55 strong, comprising ten different aircraft models; the Russian-built Yakovlev Yak-40 was among them. Also that year, the airline ordered two Boeing 787-8s.

In late 2008, the company ordered four Boeing 767-300ERs in a  million deal, and the A320 order was boosted to ten aircraft. Also in 2012, the airline retired the An-24 from active service. It was announced in  that the Islamic Development Bank signed a deal for  million with the Government of Uzbekistan that will be partly ( million) used to finance the acquisition of two Boeing aircraft, yet the type involved was not disclosed. In , the Airbus A310 was retired from active service.

The airline decided to convert two of the oldest Boeing 767-300ERs into freighters. In late , the second converted aircraft arrived in Tashkent.

Uzbekistan Airways received its first Boeing 787-8 in late . The Business Class on the 787 features the first fully flat seats of the carrier.

Retired fleet
Uzbekistan Airways previously operated the following aircraft:

 Airbus A300-600F
 Airbus A310-300
 Antonov An-24B
 Antonov An-24RV
 Avro RJ85
 Ilyushin Il-62
 Ilyushin Il-62M
 Ilyushin Il-76T
 Ilyushin Il-86
 Ilyushin Il-114-100
 Tupolev Tu-154B
 Tupolev Tu-154M
 Yakovlev Yak-40

Accidents and incidents 
According to the Aviation Safety Network,  the airline experienced eight accidents and incidents throughout its history, totalling 54 reported fatalities; only those involving fatalities and hull-losses are listed below.

See also 

 List of airlines of Uzbekistan
 Transport in Uzbekistan

References

External links 

 

Airlines of Uzbekistan
Airlines established in 1992
Former Aeroflot divisions
Government-owned airlines
1992 establishments in Uzbekistan